Floto is an American brand founded in 2003 that manufactures and markets Italian leather travel bags, briefcases, handbags and accessories. Floto products have been covered in New York Magazine, Luxist, and Kempt.  Bags are sold to consumers through the company's website, online retailers, and small boutique stores.

Awards
 Best Online Portals for Italian Leather Goods by TheTopTens.com.

References

External links 
Floto website

Leather manufacturers
Online retailers of the United States
Companies established in 2003